Josey Wales may refer to:

 Josey Wales (singer) (born 1956), Jamaican dancehall deejay
 Josey Wales (character), fictional character created by author Asa Earl Carter (credited as Forrest Carter), appearing in:
The Rebel Outlaw: Josey Wales, the 1972 American Western novel in which the character first appeared  (republished in 1975 as Gone to Texas)
The Vengeance Trail of Josey Wales, a 1976 sequel to the 1972 novel, also written by Asa Earl Carter
The Outlaw Josey Wales, a 1976 Western film starring Clint Eastwood
The Return of Josey Wales, a 1986 sequel film starring Michael Parks